The Federation of Anglican Churches in the Americas (FACA) is an association of six Continuing Anglican jurisdictions with nearly 600 parishes in the New World.  The Federation, which was founded in 2006 to enable a closer association of these and other jurisdictions, does not include any provinces of the Anglican Communion.   The vision of FACA is stated as being "faithful Anglican Churches working together in communion to fulfill the Great Commission."  The Patron of FACA is Bishop Gregory Venables of the Anglican Church of South America. He is not a member of any of FACA's six constituent denominations. These denominations include the Reformed Episcopal Church, a founding jurisdiction of the Anglican Church in North America, two ministry partner bodies, the Anglican Province of America and the Diocese of the Holy Cross, and the Anglican Mission in the Americas, an initial full member but a ministry partner since December 2011.

FACA members agree to "hold to the primacy of Holy Scripture, the Ecumenical Creeds and Councils, adhere to the Thirty-Nine Articles of Religion, and the principles of the Chicago-Lambeth Quadrilateral."  Members cooperate in federation while each uses its own version of the Book of Common Prayer and exercises its own autonomy.

Five tasks

As stated in the official articles, FACA has five tasks:

 Furthering mutual understanding of its member provinces, Jurisdictions and Ministries with a view to eventual union when and if deemed practical;
 Propagating the truths of the gospel as articulated and practiced in the historic Anglican way;
 Taking appropriate public and private steps in common causes in order to speak with one voice and act in concert for the welfare and witness of member Provinces, Jurisdictions and parishes;
 Pursuing a communal and charitable relationship with the worldwide Anglican Communion; and
 Planting mission parishes in the Americas

Members
 Reformed Episcopal Church
 Anglican Church in America
 Anglican Province of America
 Diocese of the Holy Cross
 Anglican Mission in the Americas
 Episcopal Missionary Church

References

External links
 Official website

Anglican Church in North America
Continuing Anglican movement